Versova is a metro station and the western terminus of Line 1 of the Mumbai Metro serving the Seven Bungalows, Yari Road and Versova neighbourhoods of Andheri in Mumbai, India. It opened to the public on 8 June 2014 and consists of two side platforms. The station is located at Seven Bungalows.

With 12% of all Line 1 commuters traveling through the station, Versova is the third-busiest station on the line, after MasterCard Ghatkopar and LIC Andheri.

History

Versova metro station was not planned for the metro rail but after many negotiations, the station was added. In 2012 the construction of the station was completed at a cost of ₹200Cr. A new metro is under construction in the same area by the name of Pink Line (Line 6) and will make the congestion less on Line 1

Station layout

Connections

Exits

Exit No. 1- Seven Bungalows Bus Station

See also
Public transport in Mumbai
List of Mumbai Metro stations
List of rapid transit systems in India
M-Indicator

References

External links

The official site of Mumbai Metro
 UrbanRail.Net – descriptions of all metro systems in the world, each with a schematic map showing all stations.

Mumbai Metro stations
Railway stations in India opened in 2014
2014 establishments in Maharashtra